William Henry Ireland (October 4, 1883 – April 22, 1962) was an Ontario merchant and political figure. He represented Hastings West in the Legislative Assembly of Ontario from 1919 to 1934 as a Conservative member.

He was born in Trenton, Ontario, the son of William H. Ireland. In 1908, he married Mabel Adam. Ireland was mayor of Trenton from 1916 to 1919. He died at Trenton in 1962.

References 

 Canadian Parliamentary Guide, 1922, EJ Chambers

External links 

1880s births
1962 deaths
Canadian Methodists
Mayors of places in Ontario
Progressive Conservative Party of Ontario MPPs